The 2010 Oceania Athletics Championships was the 10th edition of the Oceania Athletics Championships, organised under the supervision of the Oceania Athletic Association, in Cairns, Queensland, Australia in September. It was fourth time the championship were held in Australia. Athletes competed at two age categories: Junior (U20) and open senior. Indonesia also competed at the championships as a guest nation. The three-day competition took place from 23 to 25 September.

Medal table 
In medal tabel counted only events with 3 or more participants:

Results 
The results were published.

Men 

†: In the 100 m event, Suryo Agung Wibowo from  running as guest was 1st in 10.52 s.
‡: Result extracted from decathlon.
* Runners who participated in the heats only.

Women 

†: In the 100 m hurdles event, Dedeh Erawati from  running as guest was 2nd in 13.84s.

Mixed

During championships handicapped athletes also competed at invited events.

References

External links
Results: Thursday
Results: Friday
Results: Saturday
OAA Official website

2010
Oceania
Oceania Athletics Championships
2010 in Oceanian sport
International athletics competitions hosted by Australia
September 2010 sports events in Australia